The following elections occurred in the year 1924.

Africa
 Egyptian parliamentary election
 Kenyan general election
 Sierra Leonean general election
 South African general election
 Southern Rhodesian general election

Asia
 Ceylonese Legislative Council election
 Dutch East Indies Volksraad election
 Hong Kong sanitary board election
 Japanese general election
 Soviet Union legislative election

Europe
 Danish Folketing election
 Danish Landsting election
 Finnish parliamentary election
 French legislative election
 German federal election
 German federal election
 Italian general election
 Norwegian parliamentary election
 Swedish general election

United Kingdom
 1924 City of London by-election
 1924 Dundee by-election
 1924 United Kingdom general election
 1924 Holland with Boston by-election
 List of MPs elected in the 1924 United Kingdom general election
 1924 Oxford by-election
 1924 Westminster Abbey by-election

North America

Canada
 1924 British Columbia general election
 By-elections to the 14th Canadian Parliament
 1924 Edmonton municipal election
 1924 Newfoundland general election
 1924 Ontario prohibition referendum
 Ottawa municipal election (January)
 Ottawa municipal election (December)
 1924 Toronto municipal election

United States
 1924 United States presidential election
 1924 New York state election

United States Senate
 1924 United States Senate elections
 United States Senate election in Massachusetts, 1924
 United States Senate election in South Carolina, 1924

United States House of Representatives
 1924 United States House of Representatives elections
 United States House of Representatives elections in California, 1924
 United States House of Representatives elections in South Carolina, 1924

United States Governorships
 1924 Louisiana gubernatorial election
 1924 Minnesota gubernatorial election
 1924 South Carolina gubernatorial election

Central and South America  
 1924 Argentine legislative election
 Cuban general election
 Dominican Republic general election
 1924 Honduran general election
 1924 Newfoundland general election
 1924 Nicaraguan general election
 1924 Panamanian general election
 1924 Puerto Rican general election

Oceania

Australia
 Barossa state by-election
 Dalhousie state by-election 
 South Australian state election
 Victorian state election
 Western Australian state election
 1924 South Australian state election

See also
 :Category:1924 elections

1924
Elections